The Men's 2006 European Union Amateur Boxing Championships were held in Pécs, Hungary from May 23 to May 27. The 4th edition of the annual competition was organised by the European governing body for amateur boxing, EABA. A total number of 85 fighters from across Europe competed at these championships.

Medal winners

External links
Results
EABA Boxing

References

Boxing Championships
European Union Amateur Boxing Championships
International boxing competitions hosted by Hungary
European Union Amateur Boxing Championships